Marcus Fabius Buteo (died around 210-209 BC) was a Roman politician during the 3rd century BC. He served as consul and as censor, and in 216 BC, being the oldest living ex-censor, he was appointed dictator, legendo senatui, for the purpose of filling vacancies in the senate after the Battle of Cannae. He was appointed by the consul Varro, and, with M. Junius Pera, he was the only dictator to serve a simultaneous term with another. He resigned from the post immediately after he revised the censors' lists and enrolled the new Senate members.

By 210 BC to 209 BC, the censor Tuditanus among possible candidates for Princeps Senatus chose instead his kinsman Quintus Fabius Maximus Verrucosus. It is thought that Buteo would have earned this honor if he had been alive to accept it.

References

 Livy, Ab Urbe Condita, XXIII.xxiii.

210 BC deaths
Year of death uncertain
Year of birth unknown
3rd-century BC Roman consuls
Roman censors
Ancient Roman dictators
Buteo, Marcus